Nik Izara Aishah binti Nik Izazurin (born 28 September 1992) is a Malaysian actress and model. She debuted in 2011 and since then has starred in dramas, telemovies, television and movies.

Early life
Izara was born on 28 September 1992, in Kampung Bakar Batu, Johor Malaysia. She is the first daughter of three siblings. Her father is Malay while her mother is Pakistani. She graduated from Sekolah Menengah Kebangsaan Seri Hartamas, Kuala Lumpur. Izara began her acting career in 2011. She also won 2nd place in Dewi Remaja 2009/2010. Izara began training in Muay Thai at 16, unfortunately her training stopped due to time limitations. She has been the brand ambassador for several companies and products, and has appeared in commercials for McDonald's, Burger King and Fair and Lovely.

Personal life
Izara marries Adib Khalid, stepson of Malaysian singer, Siti Nurhaliza on 17 November 2017.

Filmography

Film

Television series

Television movie

Awards and nominations

References

External links
 
 
 

1992 births
Living people
People from Johor
Malaysian people of Malay descent
Malaysian people of Pakistani descent
Malaysian female models
Malaysian film actresses
21st-century Malaysian actresses
Malaysian television actresses